Serdar Gökhan (born Nusret Ersöz; 15 March 1943) is a Turkish actor.

Biography
Serdar Gökhan is an actor, known for Killing the Shadows (2006), The Executioner (1975) and Malkoçoğlu, the Wolf Master (1972).

Filmography

 Kuruluş: Osman (2019, cameo)
Türkler Geliyor: Adaletin Kılıcı (2020)
 Diriliş: Ertuğrul (2014) (season 1)
Kurt Seyit ve Şura (2014)
Babalar ve Evlatlar - season 1 (2012)
 Fatmagül'ün Suçu Ne? - season 2 (2011)
Kırmızı Işık - season 1 (2008)
Elif - Season 1 (2008)
Hacivat Karagöz Neden Öldürüldü? (2006)
Pertev Bey'in Üç Kızı - season 1 (2006)
Sev Kardeşim - season 1 (2006)
Karaoğlan - season 1 (2002)
Akşam Güneşi - season 1 (1999)
Kanayan Yara - Bosna Mavi Karanlık (1994)
Kurdoğlu 3 - Bu Yola Baş Koyduk (1992)
Ahmet Hamdi Bey Ailesi - season 1 (1991)
Polis Görev Başında (1990)
Av (1989)
Kanun Savaşçıları (1989)
Utanç Yılları (1987)
Yeniden Doğmak - season 1 (1987)
Namusun Bedeli (1986)
Altın Kafes (1982)
Yıkılış (1978)
Meryem Ve Oğulları (1977)
Mavi Mercedes (1977)
Şeref Yumruğu (1977)
Yuvanın Bekçileri (1977)
Analar Ölmez (1976)
Kan Kardeşler (1976)
Ölüme Yalnız Gidilir (1976)
Selam Dostum (1976)
Sevdalılar (1976)
Acı Severim Tatlı Döverim (1975)
Bu Osman Başka Osman (1975)
Cellat (1975)
Hesap Günü (1975)
Intihar (1975)
Isyan (1975)
Macera (1975)
Namıdiğer Çolak (1975)
Turhanoğlu (1975)
Yatık Emine (1974)
Bir Damla Kan Uğruna (1974)
Deli Ferhat (1974)
Dövüşe Dövüşe Öldüler (1974)
Karanlık Yıllar (1974)
Silahın Elinde Kardeş (1974)
Unutma Beni (1974)
Vur Be Ramazan (1974)
Beklenmeyen Adam (1973)
Dağ Kanunu (1973)
Hudutların Kartalı (1973)
İkibin Yılın Sevgilisi (1973)
İnsanlık Ölmedikçe (1973)
Kara Orkun (1973)
Kara Pençe'nin İntikamı (1973)
Kara Pençe (1973)
Kır çiçeği (1973)
Kurt Yemini (1973)
Soğukkanlılar (1973)
Gurbetçiler (1973)
Vur Emri (1973)
Malkoçoğlu Kurt Bey (1972)
Acı Yudum (1972)
Akma Tuna (1972)
Dudaktan Dudağa Ölüm (1972)
Estergon Kalesi (1972)
Gökçeçiçek (1972)
Irmak (1972)
Istanbul Kabadayısı Kara Murat (1972)
Kara Doğan (1972)
Kurt Bey (1972)
Asya'nın Tek Atlısı Baybars (1971)
Kadırgalı Ali (1971)

References

External links
 

1943 births
Living people
People from Bolu
Turkish male film actors
Turkish male television actors
21st-century Turkish male actors